Kizer Island is an ice-covered island about  long, lying  southwest of Cronenwett Island at the west end of the Sulzberger Ice Shelf off Saunders Coast, Marie Byrd Land, Antarctica. It was mapped from surveys by the United States Geological Survey (USGS) and from U.S. Navy air photos (1959–65), and was named for Lieutenant T.L. Kizer, U.S. Navy, a helicopter pilot on the  who sighted the island from the air on January 26, 1962.

See also 
 List of antarctic and sub-antarctic islands

References

Islands of the Ross Dependency
King Edward VII Land